Al Imran (The Family of Imran his wife Hanth his daughter Hazrat Maryam and his grand son Hazrat Isa) is the third chapter (sūrah) of the Quran with two hundred verses (āyāt).

Imran in Islam is regarded as the father of Mary. This chapter is named after the family of Imran, which includes Imran, Saint Anne (wife of Imran), Mary, and Jesus.

Regarding the timing and contextual background of the believed revelation (asbāb al-nuzūl),  the chapter is believed to have been either the second or third of the Medinan surahs, as it references both the events of Badr and the Uhud. Almost all of it also belongs to the third year of the Hijra, though a minority of its verses might have been revealed during the visit of the Najrān Christian deputation at the Mubahala, which occurred around the 10th year of the Hijrah.

Summary

1-2 God is one and self-existent 
3-4 The Quran to be believed 
5-6 God omniscient
7 Plain and obscure verses of the Quran 
8-9 The prayer of those versed in Quranic mystery 
10-12 The punishment of Pharaoh a warning to infidels 
13 The victory at the Battle of Badr alluded to 
14-18 The faithful, their character and reward 
19-20 Islam the true religion 
21-25 The punishment of unbelievers eternal 
26-27 God omnipotent and sovereign 
28-34 Obedience to the Rabbinical lineage of Abraham enjoined.
35-38 The Virgin Mary - her conception - nurtured by Zacharias 
39-41 John the Baptist, his birth 
42-57 Christ announced to the Virgin - his miracles, apostles etc.
58-65 Muhammad's dispute with the Christians of Najran 
66-77 The hypocritical Jews reproached 
78-83 Prophets not to be worshipped 
84-91 God's curse on infidels 
92 Almsgiving enjoined 
93-95 The Jews unlawfully forbid certain meats 
96-97 The Kaabah founded 
98-105 Muslims are warned against the friendship of Jews etc. 
106-109 The lot of infidels and believers contrasted 
110-112 Muslims will defeat and humiliate the Jews and Christians 
113-115 Certain Jews who accepted Islam are commended for their faith 
116-120 Muslims not to make friends of Jews and Christians 
121-122 The battle of Uhud alluded to 
123 The narration about divine intervention from God in battle of Badr, as the number of personnel and war equipments brought by Muslims are few. Muhammad al-Bukhari giving commentary about the conclusion of this verse by correlate the subsequent event about the conversation between Muhammad and Gabriel, that the help which Allah sent down to bring victory to the Muslims were in the form of the army of best angels among their kinds. This were viewed as the instruction from the verse for Muslims to always fear and be thankful for Allah.
124 Consensus of Islamic scholars and clerics has enclosed various hadiths as interpretation material for this verse that Gabriel, Michael, Raphael  and thousands of best angels from third level of sky, all came to the battle of Badr. According to a Hadith narrated by Suyuti, the third sky angels were said to rode horses. Meanwhile, Mahdi Rizqullah has compiled the commentary from classical Islamic scholars, that the verse narration about the angels attendance in the battle were also supported by hadiths from hadith collection from Muslim ibn Hajjaj, Ahmad ibn Hanbal, and the also from Quranic historiography work by Ibn Kathir. Muhammad Nasiruddin al-Albani gave commentary of another supportive narration from al-Baihaqi and Ibn Ishaq, through various hadith narration chains about the testimony from several different sahabah. This included the narration of Abbas ibn Abd al-Muttalib who at that time fought on the side of Qurayshite polytheist, who testified that he has been taken captive on the aftermath of the battle by a horse rider whom he did not recognize at all from Muslims rank. According to the hadith authority from Ahmad ibn Hanbal, The captor of Abbas were confirmed by Muhammad as one of the angel who helped the Muslims during this battle.
125 The angels that came to aid the Muslims in Badr has been strengthened by another five thousands of their kinds who wearing distinctive marks on their bodies, and on their horses which they rode which will be recognized by the Muslims in the battlefield. The distinctive marks which are reported by some reports are said to be a white scarves, while another opinions says they are red or yellow. more ️clearer source has stated that the angels has taken form of Zubayr ibn al-Awwam, companion of Muhammad. Zubayr were said usually wore yellow turban most of the time, as prophet Muhammad spoke in hadith the army of angels dressing in yellow headgear and the clothing similar to Zubayr's attire. 
126 According to various Qur'anic Tafsir scholars, particularly those who endorsed by Religious ministry of Saudi Arabia and Indonesia, this verse affirms that the victory of Muslims in Badr were solely due to the help from God who sent His angels as sign good news and fulfilment of the promise to give them victory in battle. 
128-129 Disheartened Muslims encouraged 
130-136 Usury forbidden 
137-138 The doom of defamers of the  apostles
139-144 Islam not dependent on Muhammad for success 
145-148 The former prophets are examples of perseverance 
149-151 Unbelievers to be avoided 
152-153 Certain Muslims disobedient at Uhud 
154 This verse narrates the feel drowsiness and comfort which covers the Muslims before the battle. this event were agreed by both  Abdul-Rahman al-Sa'di and group of contemporary scholars from Saudi Arabia, both from Islamic University of Madinah and committee of Masjid al-Haram this verse were revealed just before the battle of Uhud, based from Hadith narrated by Zubayr ibn al-Awwam. 
155-157 The hypocrites rebuked 
158-159 Muslims slain at Uhud to enter paradise 
160-161 Mild treatment of vacillating Muslims 
162-165 The spoils of war to be honestly divided 
166-169 The faithful sifted by defeat at Uhud 
172  Regarding Battle of Hamra al-Asad participation of Zubayr ibn al-Awwam and Abu Bakar, as exegesis scholars believed that the "wounded pious warriors" depicted in Ali Imran, Ayah 172| were intended to be az-Zubayr and Abu Bakar, two of Sahaba who lead the vanguard of this battle, after they receiving injuries from the battle of Uhud.
173-176 Certain Muslims commended for faithfulness 
177-180 The fate of unbelievers 
181 The miser's doom 
182-190 Scoffing Jews denounced—they charge Muhammad with imposture 
191-195 Meditations and prayers of the pious 
196-198 God's answer to the prayers of the pious 
199 Certain believing Jews and Christians commended 
200 Exhortation to patience and perseverance

3:33  The family of Imran
The chapter takes its name from the family of Imran mentioned in verse 3:33.

According to Christian tradition, Joachim is the husband of Saint Anne and the father of Mary, the mother of Jesus.

According to Iraqi scholar and translator, N.J. Dawood, the Quran confuses Mary mother of Jesus with Mary the sister of Moses, by referring to Mary, the mother of Jesus' father as Imran, which is the Arabic version of Amram, who in Exodus 6:20, is shown to be the father of Moses. Dawood, in a note to Surah 19:28, where Mary the Mother of Jesus is referred to as the "Sister of Aaron", and Aaron was the brother of Mary sister of Moses, states: "It Appears that Miriam, Aaron's sister, and Maryam (Mary), mother of Jesus, were according to the Quran, the same person."  Although Islamic studies of the beginning of the 20th century tended to note genealogical discrepancies, in more recent Islamic Studies of the 21st century the general consensus is, according to Angelika Neuwirth, Nicolai Sinai and Michael Marx, that the Quran does not make a genealogical error but instead makes use of typology. This is, following Wensinck's conclusion, supported by the figurative speech of the Quran and the Islamic tradition:

Similarly, Stowasser concludes that "to confuse Mary the mother of Jesus with Mary the sister of Moses and Aaron in Torah is completely wrong and in contradiction to the sound Hadith and the Qur'anic text as we have established".

This matter has been explained in the following Hadith:

Ibn Kathir (d.1373) also commented on this in his  Quranic exegesis (tafsir), recalling the Arab tradition of addressing a person as the brother or sister of their notable ancestor:

Appendix

Notes

References

Bibliography

External links
Q3:55, 50+ translations, islamawakened.com
 Al-Quran  – Āl ʿImrān (The Family of Imran)
 A fragment showing verses 85-88 from the World Digital Library
Quran 3 Clear Quran translation 

Chapters in the Quran
Islam articles needing attention
Joachim
Jesus in Islam